Daddy's Little Girl is a 2012 Australian horror thriller film written and directed by Chris Sun.  It stars Billi Baker, Michael Thomson, Allira Jaques, Holly Phillips, Rebecca Plint and Sean Gannon.

Synopsis
Derek Riley decides to take the law into his own hands when his six-year-old daughter Georgia vanishes and gets killed.

Cast
 Billi Baker as Georgia Riley
 Michael Thomson as Derek Riley
 Allira Jaques as Stacey
 Holly Phillips as Sian
 Rebecca Plint as Tanya
 Sean Gannon as Colin
 Christian Radford as Thomas "Tommy" Riley
 Mirko Grillini as Tony
 Brooke Chamberlain as Melissa
 Anthony Thomas as Derek's Father

Accolades

References

External links
 
 

2012 films
2012 horror films
2012 horror thriller films
Australian horror thriller films
Australian vigilante films
Films about child abduction
Films about child sexual abuse
Films about child death
Films set in Queensland
Films shot in Queensland
2010s English-language films
2010s Australian films